Ottmar Hofmann (20 September 1835, in Frankfurt am Main – 22 February 1900, in Regensburg) was a German entomologist. He is not to be confused with Ernst Hofmann, also an entomologist specialising in Lepidoptera. 

Ottmar Hofmann was a physician. As an entomologist, he worked on Microlepidoptera. His collection was sold to Thomas de Grey, 6th Baron Walsingham and is now in the Natural History Museum (London).

References
Obituary, in German, Nekrolog by Anton Schmid In: Berichte des naturwissenschaftlichen Vereines zu Regensburg VII.–IX. Heft, 1898–1903. Seite 134–138.

External links
 Wikisource Germany (bibliography).

German lepidopterists
Scientists from Frankfurt
1835 births
1900 deaths
19th-century German physicians